Meet the Beatles! is a studio album by the English rock band the Beatles, released as their second album in the United States. It was the group's first American album to be issued by Capitol Records, on 20 January 1964 in both mono and stereo formats. It topped the popular album chart on 15 February 1964 and remained at number one for eleven weeks before being replaced by The Beatles' Second Album. The cover featured Robert Freeman's iconic portrait of the Beatles used in the United Kingdom for With the Beatles, with a blue tint added to the original stark black-and-white photograph.

Background

After EMI's subsidiary Capitol Records constantly rejected requests by both Brian Epstein and George Martin to release Beatles records in the United States, EMI label head Sir Joseph Lockwood sent a deputy to Los Angeles in November 1963 ordering Capitol Records to commence promoting and releasing Beatles records in the United States. Despite the "first album" claim on the Meet the Beatles! cover, ten days prior to its release, Vee-Jay Records of Chicago beat Capitol to the punch with the release on 10 January 1964 of the Beatles' American debut album Introducing... The Beatles, which had been delayed for release for various reasons since the previous summer. Perhaps as a result of the Vee-Jay release, Liberty Music Shops advertised in the New York Times of 12 January 1964 that Meet the Beatles! was available for purchase, an ad not authorised by Capitol.

In 2004, the album was released for the first time on compact disc in both stereo and mono as part of The Capitol Albums, Volume 1 box set, containing the original US stereo and mono mixes. In 2014, Meet the Beatles! was reissued on CD, individually and included in the Beatles boxed set The U.S. Albums, wherein, although following the running order for Meet the Beatles!, are featured the UK mono and stereo mixes.

Music
By November 1963, the Beatles had already recorded over 35 songs for EMI's UK Parlophone label, while Capitol Records in the US planned to release an album and a single, and more at a later date. The US rights to the Beatles' first 14 tracks were held by Vee Jay Records along with a few others. "She Loves You" had been issued in America on the Swan label and also sold poorly. In Britain, Parlophone was already releasing their second Beatles album With the Beatles and had issued several singles which were not included on any UK albums with the exception of the first two ("Please Please Me"/"Ask Me Why" and "Love Me Do"/"PS I Love You"). While the Beatles' first two British albums each contained 14 tracks, in the American market albums were typically limited to 12 tracks and it was expected for albums to include the current hit single.

The first three tracks on the album include the December 1963 Capitol single "I Want to Hold Your Hand" along with the record's B-sides both in the United States, "I Saw Her Standing There," and in the UK with "This Boy" from the original November 1963 release. Neither "I Want to Hold Your Hand" nor "This Boy" had appeared on album at the time in the UK, while "I Saw Her Standing There" had been the lead-off track to the band's debut album. The other nine tracks on Meet the Beatles! are duplicated from its nearest UK counterpart album With the Beatles. Those were Beatles original songs and not cover versions of songs done by other artists with exception of "Till There Was You". The remaining five tracks from With the Beatles were songs originally recorded by other artists. Capitol determined that for their first album they would only include original and fresh material. There was fear that the remakes would turn Americans off of the Beatles. The other five songs would appear on Capitol's next American LP, The Beatles' Second Album, released in April 1964. The songs "I Want to Hold Your Hand" and "This Boy" are in a duophonic [fake] stereo, as Capitol had not been provided proper stereo mixes.

Critical reception 

The album was included in Robert Christgau's "Basic Record Library" of 1950s and 1960s recordings, published in Christgau's Record Guide: Rock Albums of the Seventies (1981).  In 2003, the album was ranked at number 59 on Rolling Stones 500 Greatest Albums of All Time list, re-ranked at number 53 on the 2012 list, and re-ranked at number 197 in 2020.

Commercial performance

In the U.S., the album debuted at No. 92 on the album chart for the week ending 1 February 1964. Two weeks later, it peaked at #1 where it remained eleven consecutive weeks, eventually replaced by The Beatles' Second Album. It sold 4,045,174 copies by 31 December 1964, and 4,699,348 copies by the end of the decade. It was certified Gold by the RIAA on 3 February 1964, and 5× Platinum on 26 December 1991.

Track listing
All tracks written by John Lennon and Paul McCartney, except where noted.

Personnel
According to Ian MacDonald:

The Beatles
 John Lennon lead and backing vocals, rhythm and acoustic guitars, handclaps; harmonica ; tambourine 
 Paul McCartney lead and backing vocals, bass, handclaps; piano ; claves 
 George Harrison backing vocals, lead and acoustic guitars, handclaps; lead vocals 
 Ringo Starr drums, handclaps; bongos ; maracas ; lead vocal 

Additional musician and production
 George Martin producer; Hammond organ ; piano 
 Norman Smith engineer

Charts and certifications

Chart performance

Certifications

Notes

References

External links

Bruce Spizer's The Beatles' Story on Capitol Records, Part One: Beatlemania and the Singles website
Bruce Spizer's The Beatles' Story on Capitol Records, Part Two: The Albums website
WhatGoesOn.com - Beatles Capitol Albums Vol. 1 now two weeks away article

1964 albums
Albums produced by George Martin
The Beatles albums
Grammy Hall of Fame Award recipients
Capitol Records albums